The Seattle Channel, cable channel 21 in Seattle, Washington, United States, is a government-access television (GATV) channel that operates out of the Seattle City Hall building. It also operates an extensive website. On CenturyLink Prism, Seattle Channel is available on channels 8003 (SD) and 8503 (HD). Seattle Channel provides coverage of select Seattle mayoral news conferences and city council meetings, and produces a wide range of award-winning original content. Feature shows include Art Zone, City Inside Out, CityStream, Civic Cocktail, and Community Stories.

At the 2019 Northwest Emmys, the Seattle Channel brought home five awards, gaining more accolades for well-established programs: Art Zone with Nancy Guppy, and CityStream.

Seattle Channel is a part of the information technology department of the City of Seattle.

Services 
The Seattle Channel streams video recorded content on their website and YouTube page 24/7. Programs are archived on the web for future viewing on seattlechannel.org. All content on the Seattle Channel is downloadable and accessible in service to the City of Seattle. According to the city policies, the Seattle Channel and its contents belong to the residents of Seattle.

Programming

Art Zone 
Originally titled Art Zone in Studio, Art Zone with Nancy Guppy premiered on the Seattle Channel in 2008. It has won nine Northwest Emmy awards and hosted many notable artists native to Washington State, including Parisalexa, Duff McKagan, Mike McCready, and Benicio Bryant. Host Nancy Guppy became well known in the Seattle area for her work as a cast member of KING-TV's comedy show Almost Live!, where she worked for 15 years.

Art Zone is known for its performances and interviews at the Seattle Georgetown Stables. This weekly program focuses on the Seattle art scene, diving deep into local talent and telling artists stories through interviews and media visuals.

CityStream 
CityStream is a weekly feature magazine program that focuses on organizations, people and places in Seattle. It is often hosted by local contracted broadcast journalists/television hosts such as Enrique Cerna, Jeff Renner, and Lori Matzukawa. CityStream is a longstanding show on the Seattle Channel. In 2019, the show won an Emmy Award in the sports category for an episode on the Special Olympics USA Games.

Civic Cocktail 
Civic Cocktail is a co-produced show between the Seattle Channel and Seattle City Club. The show invites local public figures, often in government, who contribute to a discussion led by a host with a live studio audience, mainly community members from the Seattle area. Attendees must pay a fee to partake in the Civic Cocktail event, which are distributed as season passes or individually. The location of the filming varies. Notable episodes include "Seattle:  Dying or Trying...and Changing" and "Civic Cocktail: City Council Election Analysis + How Voters Shape Seattle". There is a question and answer segment on every show, allowing Seattle residents to ask leaders and panel speakers any questions they might have concerning the topic of discussion. Civic Cocktail is taped each month from February to June, and from October to November.

City Inside Out 
City Inside Out is hosted by Brian Callanan, who was a reporter and news anchor at Q13 FOX from 2000 to 2011. The show has weekly guests, highlighting local issues and engaging in educational discussion. It is a 30-minute weekly program, composed of field reporting/interviews and studio segments. Guests on the show include Joshua Baba, Tara Moss, and Ashley Archibald.

City Inside Out has a Council Edition, where local lawmakers and politicians come on and engage in conversation with host Brian Callanan.

External links
 Official site
 Seattle Channel Facebook page
 Seattle Channel Instagram page
 Seattle Channel Twitter page
 Seattle Channel YouTube page

References 

Television stations in Seattle
American public access television
Television channels and stations established in 1985
1985 establishments in Washington (state)